Talvatissjön is a lake in the Jokkmokk Municipality in Lapland and is part of the Lule River's main catchment area. The lake has an area of 0.166 square kilometers and is 240  meters above sea level. The lake is dewatered by the watercourse Talvatissjöbäcken. It is adjacent to the town of Jokkmokk. The name comes from the Sami name of Lake Dálvvadisjávrasj, after Dálvvadis, the traditional Sami name of Jokkmokk, which is Sami for lake.

References

Lule River basin
Lakes of Norrbotten County